Murray Douglas (born 27 October 1989) is a Scottish rugby union player for the Shizuoka Blue Revs in Japan Rugby League One. His position is lock or blindside flanker.

Career
He made his debut for the Rebels against the Chiefs as a late replacement for Culum Retallick in a 24-14 defeat for the Rebels.

Super Rugby statistics

References

External links
 Murray Douglas - Harlequin Rugby

1989 births
Living people
ACT Brumbies players
Edinburgh Rugby players
Expatriate rugby union players in Australia
Expatriate rugby union players in Japan
Expatriate rugby union players in New Zealand
Hurricanes (rugby union) players
Melbourne Rebels players
Melbourne Rising players
Northland rugby union players
Rugby union locks
Rugby union players from Kirkcaldy
Scottish expatriate rugby union players
Scottish rugby union players
Shizuoka Blue Revs players